Rouyn-Noranda public transit (Fr:transport en commun), marketed as L'autobus de ville, provides local bus service in the small city of Rouyn-Noranda in northwestern Quebec, Canada.

Routes
There are 3 regular scheduled routes and a workers' special that runs only mornings and afternoons.

References

External links
Ville de Rouyn-Noranda Transport en commun (French)

Transit agencies in Quebec
Transport in Rouyn-Noranda